Elegy for Sam Emerson is a novel by the American writer Hilary Masters set in pre-9/11 Pittsburgh, Pennsylvania.

The novel tells the story of Sam Emerson, proprietor of an upscale Mount Washington restaurant with stunning views of the three rivers below. Emerson, at midlife and nostalgic, ruminates on his strange childhood as he faces the prospect of life without his much younger lover, and at the same time, deals with disposing of his mother's ashes and traveling to France to look for his father's unmarked grave.

Sources
Contemporary Authors Online. The Gale Group, 2004. PEN (Permanent Entry Number): 0000065011.

External links
 Review of Elegy for Sam Emerson in The Pittsburgh Post-Gazette
 Review of Elegy for Sam Emerson in The New York Times Book Review

2006 American novels

Novels set in Pittsburgh
Books published by university presses